Issa Soumaré (born 10 October 2000) is a Senegalese professional footballer who plays as a forward for French  club Quevilly-Rouen, on loan from the Belgian club Beerschot.

Club career
On 22 October 2019, Soumaré signed a professional contract with Orléans for four years. He debuted for Orléans in a 2–1 Ligue 2 loss to Stade Malherbe Caen on 1 November 2019.

On 6 August 2021, he signed a four-year contract with Beerschot in the Belgian top division. On 31 January 2022, Soumaré was loaned to Ligue 2 club Quevilly-Rouen until the end of the 2021–22 season. On 12 July 2022, the loan to Queville-Rouen was renewed for the 2022–23 season, with an option to buy.

International career
Soumaré is a youth international for Senegal.

References

External links
 
 
 

2000 births
Living people
Association football forwards
Senegalese footballers
Senegal youth international footballers
US Orléans players
K Beerschot VA players
US Quevilly-Rouen Métropole players
Ligue 2 players
Championnat National players
Belgian Pro League players
Senegalese expatriate footballers
Expatriate footballers in France
Senegalese expatriate sportspeople in France
Expatriate footballers in Belgium
Senegalese expatriate sportspeople in Belgium